This article is a list of events in the year 2005 in Kyrgyzstan.

Incumbents
 President: Askar Akayev (until March 24), Ishenbai Kadyrbekov (March 24 to March 25), Kurmanbek Bakiyev (from March 25)
 Prime Minister: Nikolai Tanayev (until March 25), Kurmanbek Bakiyev (March 25 to June 20, July 10 to August 15), Medetbek Kerimkulov (June 20 to July 10), Felix Kulov (from August 15)

Events

February
 February 23 - Thousands protest in support for the opposition who has been barred from the upcoming elections.

March
 March 20 - After allegations of fraud in the parliamentary election, tens of thousands of protesters take to the streets and take the town of Jalal-Abad, demanding President Akayev step down.
 March 21 - The Tulip Revolution begins as protesters take the second largest city in Kyrgyzstan, Osh.
 March 23 - Riot police break up a protest in the capital of Bishkek. President Akayev sacks his ministers for their "poor work" in handling the protests.
 March 24 - The protesters have overrun the presidential palace and the opposition plans for new elections. President Akayev is reported to have resigned and fled Bishkek by helicopter.
 March 29 - Kurmanbek Bakiyev is sworn in as interim President as Akayev states he is ready to resign.

References

 
2000s in Kyrgyzstan
Years of the 21st century in Kyrgyzstan
Kyrgyzstan
Kyrgyzstan